The Great Southern Slam (TGSS) is the largest competitive roller derby event in the Southern Hemisphere, contested by teams from New Zealand and Australia.  It is held bi-annually in Adelaide in South Australia. TGSS was created and continues to be both hosted and run by volunteers from Adelaide Roller Derby. Initially held in 2010, it was the first flat track roller derby tournament to be held in the southern hemisphere.

Format
The first round of the tournament sees teams divided into groups, which play on a round robin basis.  Each group includes one of the most experienced teams from Australia or New Zealand, a middle-ranking team, and one less experienced team.  The group winners and other teams with the highest point difference qualify for the quarter finals, and the tournament then continues on a knockout basis.  The 2012 tournament introduced additional bouts between twelve other teams, and some themed bouts with mixed teams, but these were separate from the main competition.

2010 tournament
The 2010 tournament included fifteen teams.  Geelong and Ballarat formed a joint team, while Team Pot Luck included skaters from a number of otherwise unrepresented leagues.  More than five hundred skaters were involved in the event.

2012 tournament
The 2012 tournament was held from 9–11 June.  It expanded to eighteen teams, divided into six groups for the first round.

2014 Tournament
The 2014 TGSS was held at the Adelaide Showgrounds on 7-9 June 2014.  The tournament was expanded again to 45 teams from Australia and New Zealand, playing in two divisions.

2016 Tournament
The 2016 TGSS was held from 11-13 June, with 45 teams again playing in two divisions.

2018 Tournament
The 2018 TGSS was held from 9-11 June, with 48 teams competing over three divisions. 2018 was the first year that a third division was added.

2020 Tournament 
TGSS was planned to be held in 2020 from 6-8 June at the Adelaide Showgrounds but was cancelled due to COVID-19.

2022 Tournament 
The 2022 iteration of TGSS has been confirmed for 11-13 June at the Adelaide Showgrounds. There will be 30 teams competing across three divisions.

References

External links
 Official website

Roller derby in Australia
Roller derby competitions
Recurring sporting events established in 2010
2010 establishments in Australia
Oceanian international sports competitions
Sport in Adelaide